Galene is a genus of crabs belonging to the family Galenidae

Fossil record
Fossils of Galene are found in marine strata from the Langhian to Quaternary (age range: from 15.97 to 0.012 million years ago.).  Fossils are known from Iran, Malaysia, New Zealand and Taiwan.

Species
Species within this genus include:
 Galene bispinosa Herbst 1804
 †Galene granulifera Lin 1947
 †Galene obscura Milne-Edwards 1865
 †Galene stipata Morris and Collins 1991

References

Bibliography 
Ng, Guinot & Davie (2008). Systema Brachyurorum: Part I. An annotated checklist of extant brachyuran crabs of the world. Raffles Bulletin of Zoology Supplement, n. 17, p. 1–286.
De Grave & al. (2009). A Classification of Living and Fossil Genera of Decapod Crustaceans. Raffles Bulletin of Zoology Supplement, n. 21, p. 1-109.

Pilumnoidea